Stelidota geminata, the strawberry sap beetle, is a species of sap-feeding beetle in the family Nitidulidae. It is found in Central America, North America, Oceania, South America, Europe, and temperate Asia.

References

Further reading

External links

 

Nitidulidae
Articles created by Qbugbot
Beetles described in 1825